Raudonikis is a Lithuanian surname. Notable people with the surname include:

Lincoln Raudonikis (born 1977), Australian rugby league footballer, son of Tommy
Tommy Raudonikis (1950−2021), Australian rugby league footballer and coach

Lithuanian-language surnames